= Mont Noble =

Mountain in Valais, Switzerland

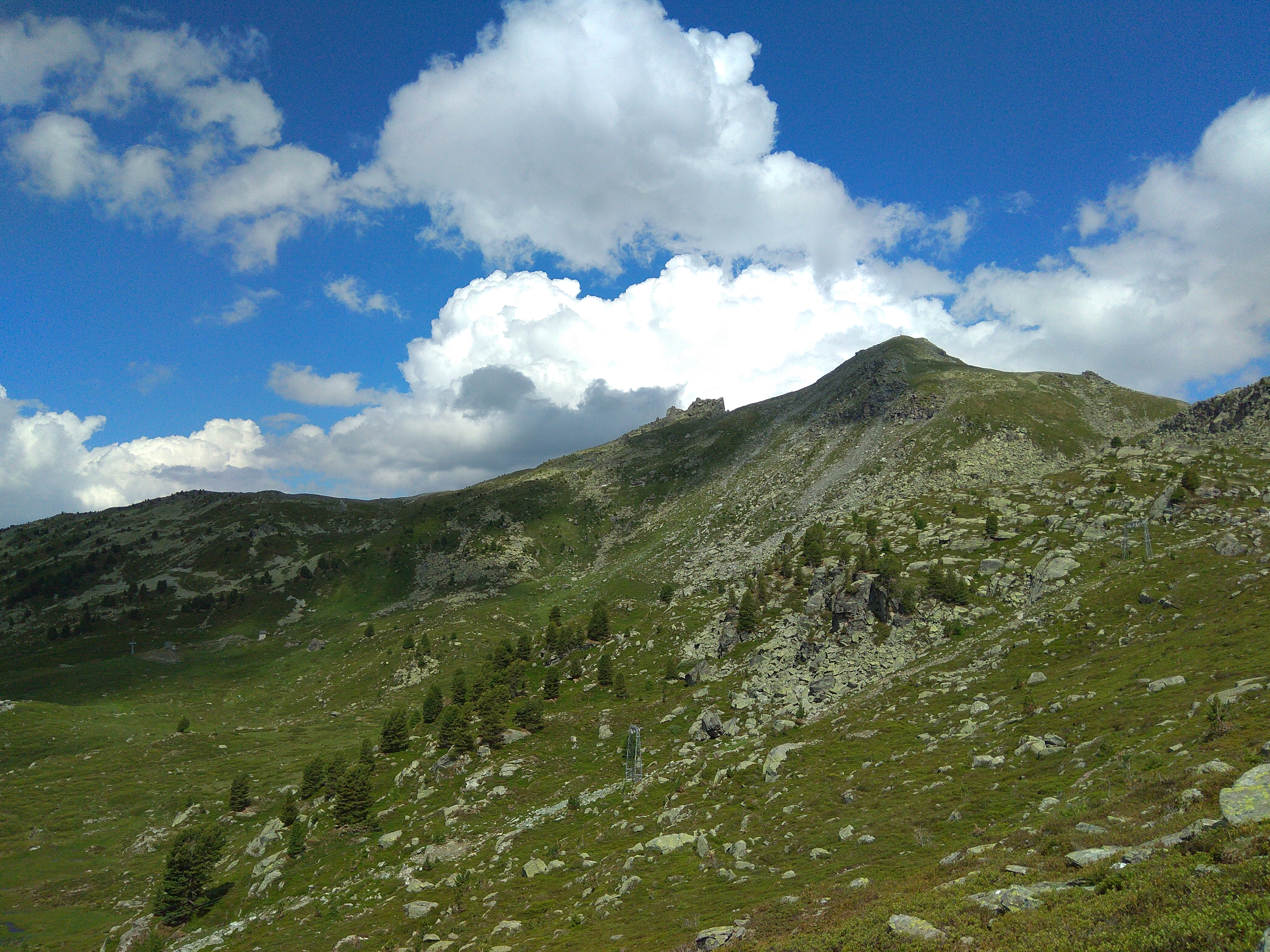

Highest point
- Elevation: 2,673 m (8,770 ft)
- Prominence: 144 m (472 ft)
- Coordinates: 46°12′26.9″N 7°29′25.9″E

Geography
- Location within Switzerland
- Location: Valais, Switzerland
- Parent range: Pennine Alps

Mont Noble (2,673 m) is a mountain of the Swiss Pennine Alps, overlooking the Val de Réchy in the canton of Valais.
